Ishq Mein Marjawan is an Indian romantic thriller television series. It aired from 20 September 2017 to 28 June 2019 on Colors TV. Produced by Yash A Patnaik under Beyond Dreams Entertainment. It starred Arjun Bijlani, Aalisha Panwar, Nia Sharma and  Sonarika Bhadoria. It is the first installment of the Ishq Mein Marjawan series.

Series

Plot
Intelligent and rich, Deep Raichand meets the beautiful Aarohi Kashyap at a party and falls for her, although he is already married to her look-alike Tara Raichand, a serial killer. In fact, Deep doesn't love Aarohi, and he and Tara only want to frame Aarohi for the murders done by Tara.

When Deep tells her that he loves her (which is actually show off) she reveals about her boyfriend Vishal. Tara kills him (so that Aarohi accepts Deep's proposal) and his plan succeeds, as the shattered Aarohi marries Deep.

Due to her nature, Deep slowly begins to fall in love with her in real while she also feels the same for him. Suspecting that Deep loves Aarohi, Tara confronts him. He denies. A jealous Tara plans to kill Aarohi. To warn him, Tara murdered Arohi's elder brother, Aniket.

Deep's family is in fact pretenders hired by him. Prithvi is his manager; Maya is Tara's aunt ; Sanaya and Sushant are indeed lovebirds who are actors from a drama company including Diya. Aarohi learns the truth. Deep finds out and tortures her, framing her for an incident and jailing her.

Two years later

Aarohi is bailed. Deep now lives in Mumbai. Aarohi disguises herself as Kesari to enter his house. Tara's mother, Roma reveals Deep's full story. He was actually an orphan, Deep Raj Singh and as Tara loved him, Roma realized only Deep can stop Tara from killing people and she got the two married.

Deep gets to know Kesari is actually Aarohi, and Deep loves and protects her so he tells Arohi that he sent her to jail only because he didn't want her dead. Aarohi pretending to be Tara goes to London with Deep. Aarohi shoots Deep and she returns to India. Deep is still alive, and he realized that he destroyed Aarohi's life and he tries to get away from Aarohi. She meets Tara simultaneously, their family comes and Deep misleads the police that Tara is Aarohi, and gets her arrested, and apologizes to Aarohi. Deep's father, Dilip Singh pretends to be disabled and Aarohi discovered it.

When Roma begs Deep for Tara's release, he helps her. Tara returns. She attempts to murder Aarohi after finding out what Deep did with her. Mistakenly, instead of Aarohi; she fatally murders Roma. Deep and Aarohi decide to remarry, but at their wedding, Tara returns. Deep and Arohi are finally married.

Three months later
Aarohi finds herself in a truck; her face has been changed. It is revealed that Deep changed her face and wanted to send her out of India. Aarohi returns to Mumbai and finds Deep living with Tara in Raichand mansion. Tara is now living as Arohi in front of everyone. Aarohi pretended to be Anjali where she discovers that her parents were alive as she tries to convince them that she is their daughter.

Aarohi discovers Deep was always using her and never really loved her. She is pregnant with his child and wants revenge, but Deep convinces her that he loves her and that they're trying to escape from Tara.

Wicked Tara plots to kill Aarohi and her child, making it seems like suicide. Aarohi assumes that Deep pushed her down a cliff. She loses her child and moves to a small village. Deep thinks Aarohi betrayed him and died with his child.

Deep begins to hate Aarohi and tries to find happiness with Tara, who feels elated as she succeeds in separating Deep and Aarohi. In the village, Aarohi meets warrior, Abhimanyu; who teaches her how to defend herself.

Abhimanyu enters Raichand mansion as a bodyguard to expose Deep and Tara's horrendous acts. Aarohi fails to take revenge on Deep who again convinces her that he loves her while persuading Tara he wants to get rid of Aarohi.

A blackmailer, named Mr. X; who tries to control the entire Raichand family, mysteriously appears. Aarohi feels that Mr. X is Deep, but she cannot prove it. Raj and Tara join forces and kill Abhimanyu. Deep and Raj were in a deadly race and game where Deep's brakes are broken, but escaped from the car, while they started fighting with each other, Raj accidentally fell down from a cliff and dies.

A few months later, after Mr. X's mystery is solved, Deep is blind and works with Shera his assistant, and does big deals. When Aarohi returns, she is shocked to see Deep is blind. She tries to find out the truth and is convinced that Deep is blind and innocent. Meanwhile, Deep has married a girl named Netra; who works for the police department and she has come to the Raichand family to arrest Deep; who is dealing in diamonds and expensive jewellery and is a white-collar criminal. Deep's new wife, Netra is a corrupt gold digger. Aarohi feels that Deep is innocent and tries to protect him from Netra. Aarohi works as a police agent to reveal the truth behind Deep.

Tara dies and her eyes are gifted to Deep; who is no longer blind. However, Tara has not died; she returns and kills Netra. The love triangle of Tara, Deep, and Aarohi continues since Deep loves Tara and Aarohi loves Deep. Later, it is shown that Deep loves Tara, and how it was plotted from the starting to the end and it is said that Arohi did everything for her love and Deep did everything for his love Tara. The show ends with Tara and Deep leaving the country and Arohi still looking for Deep. He used Aarohi as she was the look-alike of Tara to save Tara because she was a psycho serial killer and Deep loves Tara unconditionally. Aarohi went out looking for Deep and Tara, while they are trying to leave. Aarohi is left shattered and heartbroken. Thus; as a lesson, if you're to fall in love, always make sure that it is pure with fidelity in it as stated by Deep Raj Singh.

Cast

Main
 Arjun Bijlani as
 Deep Raj Singh: Vasundhara and Ranjeet's son; Raj's twin brother; Tara, Aarohi and Netra's husband (2017–2019)
 Raj Deep Singh "Mr X": Vasundhara and Ranjeet's son; Deep's twin brother (2019)
 Aalisha Panwar as
 Aarohi Deep Raj Singh (née Kashyap): Prithviraj and Charu's daughter; Aniket and Kia's sister; Deep's second wife (2017–2018) before plastic surgery
 Tara Deep Raj Singh (née Raichand): Roma and Dilip's daughter; Virat's sister; Deep's first wife (2017–2019)
 Nia Sharma as 
 Aarohi (2018–2019) (after plastic surgery)
 Anjali Sharma: Virat's girlfriend (2018)
 Sonarika Bhadoria as Netra Deep Raj Singh (née Sharma): Mohan and Swati's adopted daughter; Sanju's foster sister; Deep's third wife (2019)

Recurring
 Lata Sabharwal as Vasundhara Devi, Deep and Raj's mother (2018–2019)
 Dushyant Wagh as Kashyap/Trivedi (2018–2019)
Amit Behl as Ranjeet Pratap Singh, Deep and Raj's father (2019)
 Fahmaan Khan as CBI Officer Randhir Khurrana (2019)
 Prithvi Zutshi as Aarohi's father (2018–2019)
 Sakshi Sharma as Kia Kashyap, Aarohi's younger Sister (2019)
 Benazir Shaikh as Tarang, Randhir's assistant (2019)
 Sachin Chaubey as Shera (2017 ; 2019)
 Ravi Gossain as Mohan Sharma, Netra's adoptive father (2019)
 Rajlaxmi Solanki as Swati Sharma, Netra's adoptive mother (2019)
 Araham Sawant as Sanju Sharma, Netra's adoptive brother (2019)
 Vineet Raina as Inspector Lakshya Pradhan/ACP Virat Raichand/Malik (2017–2019)
 Mrinalini Tyagi as CBI Officer Upasana Malik (2018–2019)
 Vishavpreet Kaur as Laxmi a.k.a. Guru Maa, Abhimanyu's mother (2018–2019)
 Shoaib Ibrahim as Abhimanyu (2018–2019)
 Kishori Shahane as Deep's aunt (2018)
 Deepali Saini as Surekha (2018) 
 Shravani Goswami as Charu Kashyap, Aarohi's mother (2018)
 Ananya Soni as Sudha (2018)
 Suchita Trivedi as Sunanda Chaudhary/Roma Raichand (2018)
 Kushal Punjabi as Advocate Danny Manchanda (2018)
 Aakanksha Awasthi as Ridhi Kashyap, Aarohi's sister in-law (2017–2018)
 Abhinav Kohli as Dilip Singh, Virat and Tara's father (2018)
 Mihir Mishra as Prithvi (2017–2018)
 Akanksha Juneja as Vedika, Prithvi and Roma's daughter (2018)
 Neha Bam as Kalyani (2018)
 Tuhinaa Vohra as Maya Raichand, Roma's sister (2017–2018)
 Aashish Kaul as Dr. Bhandari Raichand (2017–2018)
 Prema Mehta as Diya (2017–2018)
 Puneet Panjwani as Shankar (2018)
 Vividha Kirti as Supriya, Aarohi's friend (2017)
 Harsh Vashisht as Aniket Kashyap, Aarohi and Kia's brother (2017)
 Arjun Aneja as Sushant (2017)
 Faiza Faiz as Sanaya (2017)
 Aashish Mehrotra as Vishal Singh, Aarohi's ex-boyfriend (2017)
 Shruti Yogi as Mayuri (2017)

Special appearances
 Arshi Khan in Holi celebration (2018)
 Ritvik Arora as Ahaan from Tu Aashiqui
 Jannat Zubair Rahmani as Pankti from Tu Aashiqui
 Rahil Azam as Jayant Dhanrajgir from Tu Aashiqui
 Raqesh Vashisth as Reyansh Diwan from Tu Aashiqui
 Vivian Dsena as Harman Singh from Shakti - Astitva Ke Ehsaas Ki
 Rubina Dilaik as Soumya Singh from Shakti - Astitva Ke Ehsaas Ki
 Meera Deosthale as Chakor from Udaan Sapnon Ki
 Vijayendra Kumeria as Sooraj from Udaan Sapnon Ki
 Shivin Narang as Jai Mittal from Internet Wala Love
 Tunisha Sharma as Aadhya Verma from Internet Wala Love
 Urvashi Dholakia as Mohini (2019)

References

External links
 
 Ishq Mein Marjawan Serial Title Song Lyrics 

2017 Indian television series debuts
Colors TV original programming
Hindi-language television shows
Indian mystery television series
Indian serial killer films